The Diavoletto d'Abruzzo or lazzaretto abruzzese is a variety of chili recognized among the Traditional agri-food products of Italy, in particular region Abruzzo.

History 
It was probably imported by Christopher Columbus from his return shipments around 1514.

Description 
It belongs to the Solanaceae family, and the fruit of the plant has an elongated shape, small or medium-small in size, with variable coloring and with the well-defined organoleptic qualities of spicy acrid.

See also
List of Capsicum cultivars

References

Cuisine of Abruzzo
Capsicum cultivars